Adnan Kudmani (born 18 January 1957) is a Syrian wrestler. He competed in the men's freestyle 62 kg at the 1980 Summer Olympics.

References

1957 births
Living people
Syrian male sport wrestlers
Olympic wrestlers of Syria
Wrestlers at the 1980 Summer Olympics
Place of birth missing (living people)
20th-century Syrian people